Eddy Prentice (24 September 1920 – 20 September 2009) was a New Zealand cricketer. He played one first-class match for Auckland in 1945/46.

See also
 List of Auckland representative cricketers

References

External links
 

1920 births
2009 deaths
New Zealand cricketers
Auckland cricketers
People from Reefton
Sportspeople from the West Coast, New Zealand